Mizhi Randilum (English: In both Eyes) is a 2003 Malayalam film written and directed by Ranjith, starring Dileep, Kavya Madhavan,  Indrajith, Jagathy Sreekumar, Sukumari, and Revathi. This movie was actor Narendra Prasad's last film.

Plot
Bhadra (Kavya Madhavan) is a nurse who is living with her widowed mother, grandmother and twin sister Bhama, a medical student. Her older brother Achuthankutty (Jagathy Sreekumar) is a politician. Bhadra falls in love with Arun (Indrajith), a doctor who works with her. Arun has a Muslim father and a Hindu mother who agrees to have Bhadra as their daughter in law, but Achuthankutty hates him because his father is a Muslim, causing Arun and Bhadra to break up.

Meanwhile, Achuthankutty has troubles with a ruthless businessman and moneylender named Krishnakumar(Dileep) who forces Achuthankutty to sell the family house to him. Bhadra and Bhama are left to be taken care of by their sister-in-law. She meets Krishakumar's sister Sridevi who was paralyzed after the death of their parents. Krishnakumar falls in love with Bhadra owing to her simplicity and proceeds to marry her. Bhadra's life takes a tragic turn when Arun commits suicide, and Bhadra goes into mental shock. Krishnakumar decides to take care of the traumatized Bhadra and later marry her.

The story has a positive ending were we see Bhadra telling Krishnakumar that she is pregnant.

Cast
Kavya Madhavan ...  Bhadra & Bhama (Double Role) 
Indrajith ...  Dr. Arun
Dileep ...  Krishnakumar  
Jagathy Sreekumar ...  Thechikkattu Achuthankutti 
Sukumari ...  Bhadra's Mother 
Revathi ...  Sridevi 
Vijayakumari ...  as Yasodara
Narendra Prasad ...  Bappuji
Janardhanan ...  Thampi
Siddique ... Menon
Sai Kumar ... R. V
Kunchan ...  Vasu 
Shobha Mohan ...  Devi 
Kalpana ...  Sarada 
Zeenath ...  Vathsala Koshy 
Augustine ...  Bichu 
Sadiq
Abu Salim as Santosh, Sarada's Husband
Meena Ganesh
Santha Devi as grandmother
V. K. Sreeraman
C V Dev as Uncle's Right Hand

Release 
The film was released on 31 October 2003.

Box office
The film received positive reviews from the critics, but it was box office failure.

Soundtrack 
The film's soundtrack contains 6 songs, all composed by Raveendran, with lyrics by Sarath Vayalar.  
All the songs are evergreen hits.

References

External links
 

2000s Malayalam-language films
2003 films
2003 romantic drama films
Films directed by Ranjith
Films scored by Raveendran
Indian romantic drama films
Films shot in Palakkad
Films shot in Ottapalam